James Landon Knight (July 21, 1909 – February 5, 1991) was an American newspaper publisher and co-founder of the Knight Ridder group of newspapers.

He was also co-founder of the John S. and James L. Knight Foundation with his brother John S. Knight.

The James L. Knight Center in Miami, Florida is named in his honor.

He caught a then-record 585-pound blue marlin in 1964 on a fishing trip that saw the sinking of the family's 75-foot pleasure boat.

References

1909 births
1991 deaths
Businesspeople from Akron, Ohio
American newspaper chain founders
Knight family (newspapermen)
20th-century American newspaper publishers (people)
20th-century American businesspeople
Western Reserve Academy alumni